is an era in Japanese history. This era spanned the years from April 1299 through November 1302. Preceding it was the Einin era, and following it was the Kengen era.

Change of era
 1299 : The new era name was created to mark an event or a number of events. The previous era ended and a new one commenced in Einin 7.

Events of the Shōan era
 November 1, 1299 (Shōan 1, 8th day of the 10th month): Chinese Chan master Yishan Yining arrived in Kamakura as a last Mongol envoy. 
 March 2, 1301 (Shōan 3, 21st day of the 1st month): In the 5th year of Go-Fushimi-tennōs reign (後伏見天皇5年), the emperor was forced to abdicate; and the succession (‘‘senso’’) was received by his cousin. Shortly thereafter, Emperor Go-Nijō is said to have acceded to the throne (‘‘sokui’’).
 1301 (Shōan 3): Gokenho, a Buddhist text was printed.
 1302 (Shōan 4): Eikan-dō Zenrin-ji mandala is said to have been completed.

Notes

References
 Nussbaum, Louis-Frédéric and Käthe Roth. (2005).  Japan encyclopedia. Cambridge: Harvard University Press. ;  OCLC 58053128
 Titsingh, Isaac. (1834). Nihon Odai Ichiran; ou,  Annales des empereurs du Japon.  Paris: Royal Asiatic Society, Oriental Translation Fund of Great Britain and Ireland. OCLC 5850691
 Varley, H. Paul. (1980). A Chronicle of Gods and Sovereigns: Jinnō Shōtōki of Kitabatake Chikafusa. New York: Columbia University Press. ;  OCLC 6042764

External links
 National Diet Library, "The Japanese Calendar" -- historical overview plus illustrative images from library's collection

Japanese eras
1290s in Japan
1300s in Japan